The Georgian Bay Formation is a geologic formation in Michigan and Ontario. It preserves fossils dating back to the Ordovician period. The type locality of the formation is on East Meaford Creek (previously called Workman Creek), south shore of Nottawasaga Bay, Georgian Bay.

Description
The formation consists of massive shale interbedded with siltstone/sandstone and limestone, with sub-horizontal bedding planes and widely-spaced jointing.

Fossil content

Ichnotaxa

Vertebrates

Invertebrates

See also

 List of fossiliferous stratigraphic units in Michigan

References

 

Ordovician Michigan
Ordovician southern paleotemperate deposits
Ordovician southern paleotropical deposits